Valdis Valters (born August 4, 1957) is a retired Latvian professional basketball player. He played at the point guard position for the senior USSR national team. He is regarded as one of the greatest players to have played the game in Europe in the 1980s. Considering his lengthy work and deep connection to the sport, Valters has been one of the most influential people in Latvian basketball history. He became a FIBA Hall of Fame player in 2017.

Club career
Valters spent most of his club career playing with the Latvian club VEF Rīga. In 1982, he set the USSR Premier League's all-time record for points scored in a single game, when he scored 69 points against Dynamo Moscow.

National team career

Soviet national team
Valters first made his name in European basketball when he was named the MVP of EuroBasket 1981, after he averaged 16.7 points per game, to lead his USSR national team to the gold medal. He was also on the All-Tournament Team of EuroBasket 1985.

Valters also played a key role on the USSR national team that won the gold at the 1982 FIBA World Championship, in Colombia, where he was a starting point guard, and averaged 14.0 points per game.

At the 1986 FIBA World Championship, Valters helped the Soviet Union to rally from a nine-point deficit, in the final minute of the game, by hitting a three-pointer at the end of regulation, to send the semifinal game against Yugoslavia to overtime, and eventually earn a 91–90 win.

Latvian national team
In 1992, after he had stopped playing basketball at the pro level, Valters returned to the court, and represented the senior Latvian national team at the 1992 Summer Olympic Games Qualifying Tournament.

Coaching career
After his basketball playing career ended, Valters also worked as a basketball coach and general manager. He founded his own basketball school, the Valtera Basketbola Skola (VBS), now known as Keizarmezs, whose alumni includes former NBA player Andris Biedriņš, as well as other top Latvian players. He also helped to create the basketball league for Latvian youth players, the LJBL.

Other works
In 2013, Valters released his autobiographical book, called "Dumpinieks ar ideāliem" (Rebel with ideals). He is currently working as an analyst for the Latvian TV channel, TV6, as a host of the weekly sports show Overtime.

Personal life
Both of his sons, Kristaps and Sandis, are also professional basketball players.

References

External links 
FIBA Profile
FIBA Hall of Fame Profile
FIBA Europe Profile

1957 births
Living people
BK VEF Rīga players
FIBA EuroBasket-winning players
FIBA Hall of Fame inductees
FIBA World Championship-winning players
Honoured Masters of Sport of the USSR
Latvian basketball coaches
Latvian men's basketball players
Point guards
Soviet men's basketball players
Basketball players from Riga
1982 FIBA World Championship players
1986 FIBA World Championship players